The 1974 Air Canada Silver Broom, the men's world curling championship, was held from March 18 to 23 at the Allmend Eisstadion in Bern, Switzerland.

Teams

Round-robin standings

Round-robin results

Draw 1

Draw 2

Draw 3

Draw 4

Draw 5

Draw 6

Draw 7

Draw 8

Draw 9

Playoffs

Semifinals

Final

References

External links

World Men's Curling Championship
Curling
Air Canada Silver Broom, 1974
International curling competitions hosted by Switzerland
International sports competitions hosted by Switzerland
Sports competitions in Bern
20th century in Bern
March 1974 sports events in Europe